Isabel Maria Bastos Osório de Castro e Oliveira (August 1, 1931 – November 23, 2005) was a Portuguese film actress.

Biography
She was born in the capital Lisbon in 1931 to José Osório de Castro e Oliveira (Setúbal, 27 January 1900 - Lisbon, 3 December 1964) and writer Raquel Bastos, granddaughter of the writer  Ana de Castro Osório, brother of the writer João Osório de Castro.

Castro's career began with the movie Ladrão, Precisa-se! in 1946. Later, she appeared in some Spanish films including Under the Skies of the Asturias where she played as Angelina Quirós, The Pelegrín System, Lawless Mountain as Maria and in El cerco. She played in more Portuguese films including Francisca (1981), O Desejado (1987) and Hard Times (1988). In the mid-1990s, she went to Cape Verde, appearing in the films Down to Earth (1995) and The Island of Contenda (1996), the latter based on the novel by Henrique Teixeira de Sousa, in which she played the character of Nha Caela. Her last movie was A Casa Esquecida, in 2004. She appeared in about 50 films and appeared in theatre and television.

She died of cancer in Borba near Évora.

Personal life
In 1948, she married Óscar Acúrsio, she later married Miguel Luke

Selected filmography

Short films
A Voice of the Night (1998)
Jerónimo (1998)
Henrique (2001)

References

External links
 

Portuguese film actresses
Portuguese television actresses
People from Lisbon
1931 births
2005 deaths
Deaths from cancer in Portugal